The Wrestling Competition at the 2005 Mediterranean Games was held in the Huércal de Almería Sports Hall in Almería, Spain from June 26 to July 1, 2005.

Medal table

Medalists

Men's freestyle

Men's Greco-Roman

Women's freestyle

References
Results

Mediterranean Games
Wrestling
2005
Wrestling in Spain
International wrestling competitions hosted by Spain